The 2009–10 season of the División de Plata is the 17th season of second-tier futsal in Spain.

Regular season

League table - Group Norte

League table - Group Sur

Playoffs for promotion

Group winners

First leg

Second leg

Third leg

The winner team is promoted to División de Honor: GE Talavera

The loser team continues in 2nd round: Fisiomedia Manacor

For remaining teams

First round

First leg

Second leg

Third leg

Second round

First leg

Second leg

Third leg

Final Round

First leg

Second leg

Third leg

The winner team is promoted to División de Honor: Fisiomedia Manacor

Top goal scorers
,

External links
2009–10 season at lnfs.es

See also
2009–10 División de Honor de Futsal
División de Plata

2009 10
2009–10 in Spanish futsal
futsal